The 2016 Dangyang explosion was an explosion that occurred at the coal-fired power plant of Madian Gangue Power Generation Company located in Dangyang, Hubei, China on 11 August 2016 at 15:20 local time (07:20 UTC). It initially killed twenty-one people and injured five, three of them critically.

Events
The explosion involved a high-pressure steam pipe, which had burst and began leaking during a debugging process for the unfinished power plant.

On 13 August, it was reported by the State Administration of Work Safety that the death toll had risen to twenty-two. The explosion also caused the power plant and nearby companies to close and prompted a work safety overhaul to be launched in the city.

References

2016 disasters in China
2016 industrial disasters
Explosions in 2016
Explosions in China
Industrial fires and explosions in China
History of Hubei
Dangyang
August 2016 events in China